Bromidol has been used to refer to two quite different drugs;

 An official trade name for the antipsychotic drug bromperidol
 A slang name for a potent opioid drug, BDPC